Jotsholo, which has often been incorrectly written as Tshotsholo, is a small town in the Lupane district, in the province of Matabeleland North, Zimbabwe. It is located about 205 km northwest of Bulawayo.

Populated places in Matabeleland North Province